The Cividade de Âncora (also known as Cividade de Afife) is an archaeological site of the Castro culture located in the border between the municipalities of Viana do Castelo (Afife) and Vila Praia de Âncora. The Cividade was built during the Iron Age (2nd Century BCE) and was occupied up to the Romanization of Hispania (1st Century CE). Despite no evidence of occupation after the Roman period, two Stelae belonging to the Middle Ages were found in the area. The Cividade was first dug in 1880 by Francisco Martins Sarmento and the last intervention was in 1984. The Cividade de Âncora is an unclassified monument, being in the process of classification since 1979. It's findings can be seen in Caminha and Viana do Castelo's municipal museum.

Architecture 
The Cividade was built on the Monte da Suavidade ("Hill of Softness"), overseeing the Âncora River. The hill has a maximum height of 187m and is 1250m from the sea. Along with other smaller settlements, it controlled the access to tin and gold in the mountain ranges of Santa Luzia and Arga.

It is protected by three lines of stone walls, with an average width of 1.5m. The Cividade's cemetery was located within the residential section of the Cividade. The houses were of circular and oval shape, made of stone walls and ceilings of perishable materials. The houses were typically arranged around a central patio with a cistern or fountain.

See also 

 Citânia de Briteiros
 Castros in Portugal
 History of Portugal

References 

Former populated places in Portugal
Castros in Portugal
Viana do Castelo